Aidan Hutchinson (born August 9, 2000) is an American football defensive end for the Detroit Lions of the National Football League (NFL). He played college football at Michigan, where he won several awards as a senior in 2021, such as the Ted Hendricks and Lombardi Awards, as well as being named runner-up for the Heisman Trophy. Hutchinson was selected second overall by the Lions in the 2022 NFL Draft.

Early years
Hutchinson was born on August 9, 2000, in Plymouth, Michigan. He attended Divine Child High School in Dearborn, Michigan, where he played defensive end, tight end, offensive line, and long snapper. He played in the 2018 U.S. Army All-American Game and had two sacks. Hutchinson committed to play college football at the University of Michigan.

College career
As a true freshman at Michigan in 2018, Hutchinson played in all 13 games and had 15 tackles. As a sophomore in 2019, he started all 13 games, recording 68 tackles and 4.5 sacks. As a junior in 2020, he started the first three games until he had a season-ending injury.

As a senior in 2021, Hutchinson set the team's single-season sack record at 14. He won several awards for his efforts, including the Ted Hendricks Award, Lombardi Award, Lott IMPACT Trophy, and the Chicago Tribune Silver Football. He was also the runner-up for the Heisman Trophy, the only defensive player among three quarterbacks to be named a finalist.  Following the season, Hutchinson declared for the 2022 NFL Draft.

College statistics

Professional career

Hutchinson was selected in the first round with the second overall pick by the Detroit Lions in the 2022 NFL Draft. He signed his four-year contract, worth $35.7 million fully guaranteed, on May 9, 2022. Hutchinson recorded three sacks, a Lions rookie record, in Week 2 against the Washington Commanders. He recorded his first career interception in a 15–9 victory over the Green Bay Packers on November 6, 2022, with a second interception against the New York Giants two weeks later. He finished his rookie season with 9.5 sacks, 52 total tackles (34 solo), three interceptions, three passes defensed, and two fumble recoveries. He was named to the PFWA All-Rookie Team.

NFL Career Statistics

Regular Season

Awards and records

NFL awards
 Pepsi NFL Rookie of the Year (2022)
 NFC Defensive Player of the Week – 2022 (Week 11)
 2× NFC Defensive Rookie of the Month – November 2022, December 2022–January 2023

Personal life
His father, Chris Hutchinson, also played college football at Michigan. His mother, Melissa Sinkevics, won the 1988 Miss Michigan Teen USA event while his older sister, Aria, won Miss Michigan USA 2022.

References

External links

 
 
 Detroit Lions bio
 Michigan Wolverines bio

2000 births
Living people
American football defensive ends
Detroit Lions players
Michigan Wolverines football players
All-American college football players
People from Plymouth, Michigan
Sportspeople from Wayne County, Michigan
Players of American football from Michigan